Anthony Fry is a British business executive. He was appointed a trustee of the BBC in 2008, and appointed for a second term in July 2012. In 2013 he succeeded Dave Richards as chairman of the soccer Premier League. He resigned in June 2014 following a stroke.

References

External links
 BBC Trust biography
 English National Opera biography
 Entry in Debretts
 Personal website

Living people
Trustees of the British Broadcasting Corporation
Presidents of the Oxford University Conservative Association
Year of birth missing (living people)